Arnold Hastie Moffitt (12 December 1883 – 19 July 1963) was an Australian rules footballer who played for the St Kilda Football Club in the Victorian Football League (VFL).

He was incorrectly identified as Alec pr Alexander Moffatt for many years.

Notes

External links 

1883 births
1963 deaths
Australian rules footballers from Victoria (Australia)
St Kilda Football Club players